Gilbert Benjamin Atencio, also called Wah Peen (English: Mountain of the Sacred Wind; 1930–1995), was a San Ildefonso Pueblo painter, potter, medical Illustrator, and politician.

Early life and education 
Atencio was born in 1930 in Greeley, Colorado. He was the daughter of Benjamin Atencio and painter Isabel Montoya, who was a cousin of Maria Martinez. His brothers Pat Atencio and Tony Atencio were also artists, as were his sisters Helen Gutierrez and Angelita Sanchez. 

He studied at the San Ildefonso Day School and then at the Santa Fe Indian School, graduating in 1947.

Career 
Known for his portraiture and portrayals of local ceremonies and customs, he has exhibited his work across the country. He was trained in the Studio style, and was initially interested in portraiture. An early success was his painting of his relatives Maria and Julian Martinez. His later work often broke from the Studio style and showed influence of self-taught painters like Fred Kabotie. His drawings often feature a number of figures, with apparel and features meticulously rendered. By the 1930s, Atencio also painted abstract or semi-abstract works.

Atencio served as Governor of the San Ildefonso Pueblo in 1966 to 1967. He worked for some years as a medical illustrator.

Death and legacy 
Atencio died on April 6, 1995, in Albuquerque, New Mexico. Some of his works have been in the permanent collection of institutions including the Museum of New Mexico, the National Museum of the American Indian, the Gilcrease Museum, and the Philbrook Museum of Art.

Atencio's paintings were included the book, Southwest Indian Painting: A Changing Art (1957, University of Arizona Press) by Clara Lee Tanner.

References

External links 
 Gilbert Atencio artworks at the Smithsonian National Museum of the American Indian

1930 births
1995 deaths
20th-century American painters
20th-century indigenous painters of the Americas
Native American painters
Pueblo artists
Painters from Colorado
Painters from New Mexico
20th-century Native Americans